Baek Ji-won (born 30 April 1973) is a South Korean actress. She graduated in Horticultural Science from Kyung Hee University. She made her acting debut in 1996 in play My father got cancer. (2020). In 2021, she appeared in sports drama Racket Boys and in tvN's Melancholia alongside Im Soo-jung.

Filmography

Film

Television series

Web series

Awards and nominations

References

External links

 
 Baek Ji-won on Daum 
 

21st-century South Korean actresses
South Korean film actresses
South Korean television actresses
Living people
1973 births